Impatiens gordonii also known as the Seychelles bizzie lizzie is a species of flowering plant in the family Balsaminaceae. It is critically endangered.

There is a species action plan.

Distribution 
It is endemic to the Seychelles.

Taxonomy 
It was named by John Horne  ex John Gilbert Baker,  in Fl. Mauritius: 38 in 1877.

References

External links 

 https://www.inaturalist.org/taxa/439100-Impatiens-gordonii/browse_photos

gordonii